Li Zhizhao (born 6 August 1999) is a Chinese footballer who plays as a goalkeeper for Sichuan Jiuniu F.C.

Career statistics

Club
.

Notes

References

1999 births
Living people
Footballers from Guangzhou
Footballers from Guangdong
Chinese footballers
Association football goalkeepers
China League One players
Chinese Super League players
Guangzhou F.C. players
Qingdao F.C. players
21st-century Chinese people